Enrico Santangelo (Pescara, 1963) is an Italian author and art historian.

Born in Pescara, where he currently lives and works, Enrico Santangelo is an architect and painter. He wrote several publications about heritage in Abruzzo.

On his debut as novel writer, in 2000 he won the literary competition for young authors "Pescarabruzzo" with the book "Il paese di Aiace" (The town of Ajax).

Bibliography

References 

1963 births
People from Pescara
Italian male non-fiction writers
Italian art historians
Living people